Nicholas Matthew Taitague (born February 17, 1999) is an American former soccer player who played as a midfielder.

Career
Taitague signed a short-term amateur contract with Carolina RailHawks on April 8, 2016.  In February 2017, following his 18th birthday, Taitague officially signed with Schalke 04.  On March 23, 2017, Taitague made his debut for Schalke's U19 team.

After playing no competitive match for the first team of Schalke, his contract with the club was terminated on January 2, 2021. On May 17, 2021, Taitague announced his retirement from professional soccer following a series of serious injuries that left him sidelined indefinitely.

International career
Taitague has represented the United States at different youth levels. He also qualifies to play for Guam through his paternal grandfather.

Career statistics

References

1999 births
Living people
North Carolina FC players
American expatriate soccer players
American expatriates in Germany
Expatriate footballers in Germany
Association football midfielders
Soccer players from Virginia
North American Soccer League players
American soccer players
United States men's youth international soccer players
American people of Chamorro descent
People from Midlothian, Virginia
FC Schalke 04 II players
FC Schalke 04 players
Regionalliga players